Maximilian of Bavaria may refer to:
 Maximilian I, Elector of Bavaria (1573–1651)
 Maximilian II Emanuel, Elector of Bavaria (1662–1726)
 Maximilian III Joseph, Elector of Bavaria (1727–1777)
 Maximilian I Joseph of Bavaria (1756–1825)
 Maximilian II of Bavaria (1811–1864)
 Duke Maximilian Joseph in Bavaria (1808–1888)
 Duke Maximilian Emanuel in Bavaria (1849–1893)
 Prince Max, Duke in Bavaria (born 1937)